Tower Prep is a live-action teen science-fiction television series created by Paul Dini for Cartoon Network. It aired 13 episodes between October 16 to December 28, 2010. Prior to Tower Prep, Dini was a producer and writer of Batman: The Animated Series, Superman: The Animated Series and other DC animated universe series.

The series aired for one season prior to being canceled by Cartoon Network. It featured Ian Archer, a teenager with supernatural abilities who explored the mysteries of Tower Prep, an isolated institution to which Ian and his classmates arrived with no memory of how they got there.

Premise
Tower Prep is an exclusive boarding school for people with special abilities. None of the students know where they are or how they arrived there, and there's no way to escape the campus itself, which is a large complex of buildings surrounded by dense forest.

The series starts with Ian Archer sitting at home playing a video game after being suspended for fighting another student at his home high school. Before he knows it, Archer finds himself waking up at Tower Prep with no memory of how he got there and no recognition of the other students around him. Panicking, he tries to escape, and in the course of his failed attempt he meets three other students: Gabe Forrest, Suki Sato and CJ Ward, each with their own unique abilities. Throughout the series, the four friends make it their mission to uncover the mysteries behind Tower Prep and find a way to return to their normal lives.

Through the series, the four determine that they are on Earth in a small peninsula, with steep bluffs, inherited by the founder of Tower Prep. The peninsula is also home to many rare specimens of plants and animals from around the world, such as poison ivy and a venomous fly only found in mid-continental Africa.

Characters

Main
 Ian Archer (Drew Van Acker) – Ian has the ability of "Preflex," seeing things before they happen and react. He's a rebel who wants to discover the secrets of Tower Prep and is trying to escape from the strange school. His ability allows him to be exceptional in martial arts and physical fights, and he uses his skills to defend the students who can't protect themselves from other students. He may be related to the founder of Tower Prep. Conner calls Ian "his liege" in the episode "Dreams", which implies that his family has something to do with Tower Prep and Cornelius Tower. Him and CJ have a crush on each other but they don't show it. In the episode "Phone Home" Ian and CJ have their first kiss.
 Gabriel "Gabe" Lexington Forrest (Ryan Pinkston) – Gabe has the ability of "Hypersuasion," allowing him to talk almost anyone into doing anything. His skill seems to be less effective the longer he stays at Tower Prep. He's the class clown and the school class president. He also has a crush on Suki.
 Candice "CJ" Ward (Elise Gatien) – CJ has the ability to read people's body language, called "Perception." CJ claims to have no memory of her life before Tower Prep. To everyone at Tower Prep, CJ is a textbook example of someone who follows "The Program". She is the perfect student, the most popular girl in school and well liked by everyone; that is exactly what she wants everyone to think as she secretly plots to escape from the school. CJ is a master at playing both sides and hiding her true intentions. In the episode "Whisper", she finds out that her abilities have increased allowing her to understand people from their handwriting. It is revealed in the episode "The Rooks" that she has a crush on Ian despite being cold to him in the beginning. In the episode "Phone Home", CJ and Ian kiss. She tells him that she doesn't want him to die if he's never kissed a girl. In the episode "Snitch", it is revealed that she is Headmaster's daughter and that he forced her to tell him everything she knew. In the episode "Fathers", her name is revealed to be Candace. Even though she is exposed as the snitch, she still cares very deeply about her friends and dreads losing them. After Ian knocks out the Headmaster she still asks to go escape with them. She hasn't talked to her mother in a long time, so she agrees to do whatever her father commands on the condition that she gets to talk to her mother again.
 Suki Sato (Dyana Liu) – Suki, from Tokyo, has the ability to imitate anything as long as she has heard the voice/sound at least once. She can replicate handwriting with 100% accuracy and also be able to mimic animal noises as seen in the episode "Field Trip" where she impresses Ray Snider by mimicking a lion's roar. Her power is known as "Mimicry." She's a quiet, introspective girl whose bubbly personality shines through. She is "as quiet as a mouse." Her father owns Sato Systems (formerly known as SatoScientific), a well known electronics company that is the main technology provider for the school. They make everything electronic, including the security cameras and communication devices, as well Whisper 120, Whisper 119 and Whisper 023, the school's supercomputer. She has an older brother, Shinji, whom she once believed was dead, who also went to Tower Prep. She kisses Gabe in episode "Phone Home" after he tells her that he's never kissed a girl, although in the episode "Dreams" in her dream she kisses Ian which shows that she might have feelings for him also. In the episode "Fathers", Suki's father tries to take her away from Tower Prep because she "isn't for Tower Prep and Tower Prep isn't for her". Her father almost succeeds, until Ian defeats him and his bodyguards.

Tower Prep staff
The teachers of the school do not use their actual names, and are instead called by the subjects they teach. 
 Headmaster (Ted Whittall) – Headmaster insists that Tower Prep's purpose is solely to refine the exceptional students' abilities for the better, but there are hints that suggest he has other plans. He is possibly the actual leader of the Rooks, as Coach called him "Most Exalted One" in one of their talks. In the episode "Trust" it is revealed that he reports to a higher administrative board. In the episode "Snitch", it is revealed that he is CJ's father and that he is trying to make Tower Prep like it was when Cornelius ran the school. He is secretly working against the head administration. Only 7 people know: Suki, Ian, CJ, Gabe, Cornelius Tower, the Headmaster himself, and one more person.
 Coach (Dan Payne) – Coach is a former student of Tower Prep and a test subject for Corvus H-40, a chemical substance used as a "performance enhancer", although it is implied that the Corvus H-40 has significant side effects. Both he and Headmaster are Rooks members, even though Headmaster actively speaks out against them. Coach wears a watch with the Rooks emblem. It is possible that Coach no longer has an ability due to Corvus H-40 abuse. It is also revealed in the episode "Snitch" that when Coach was a student at Tower Prep, he was incarcerated in the West Campus; he describes it as "the greatest thing you fear."
 Coach History (Richard Steinmetz) – He is the red buffer coach and the school's history teacher. He once told Ian that if he beat the gold team (regular coach's team) the coach would reveal all he knew of the school's history. In the process, it was discovered that the Gnomes are Tower Prep students.
 Nurse (Karin Konoval) – She was a suspect in the Chemica Desin epidemic. Ian discovered that the true suspect was Ross Anderson, who stole the Chemica Desin during her work study in the clinic and modified it. When Ross Anderson was at the Headmaster's Office, she didn't punish her, but instead asked how she modified the Chemica Desin. Connor later finds the Chemica Desin 2.0 which hints that they made more of the modified version that Ross created.
 Dr. Specs (Alek Diakun) – He works in the medical lab hidden in the tunnels. There, he prepares new students by erasing their short-term memory with electronic static, then transports them to the campus using the tunnels. He may be the doctor seen in the old surveillance video footage strapping a student to a chair while Cornelius Tower tries to stop him. He is seen giving Conner Owens and later Gabe a mind-wipe at West Campus using "In my Dreams Tonight" by Cookie Tower and the Hypnotic Five.

Supporting
 Whisper 119 (voiced by Peggy Jo Jacobs) – It is the artificial intelligence that manages the school and serves as a "recruitment officer" by contacting children who have exceptional abilities. She is shown to have emotions in episode the "Whisper"; Ian realizes she sent him the "handwritten" note saying "I'm scared, too", which CJ analyzes as "caring, artistic, and motherly." Whisper indirectly helps Ian, Gabe, Suki, and CJ out of some tight situations. In the episode "Phone Home", Whisper 119 was upgraded to Whisper 120 but as one last act against the school she opens the door to the roof of one of the school's abandoned buildings for Gabe, Suki, CJ and Ian right before she "dies" and gets upgraded. After Conner's return it is revealed that she was upgraded because she was developing a conscience that allowed students to temporarily exit the school through the holographic/hallucinogenic wall.
 Ray Snider (Richard Harmon) – Ray is a student at Tower Prep who was one of Ian's initial roommates. He clashes with Ian after Ian moves out of their room. He considers Suki a "hottie", but he also cares deeply for Suki. In the episode "The Rooks" he is a member of the elite fraternity. His ability is Hyper-strength. Along with Emily and Fenton, Ray seems to suspect Ian, CJ, Suki, and Gabe's plan to escape after they discover maps of the school grounds in episode "Field Trip".
 Calvin "Cal" Rice (Izaak Smith) – Cal is Ian's main antagonist. He is the captain of the gold Buffer team and is the so-called head jock of the school. He constantly pushes Ian around and seems threatened by him. His ability is enhanced hearing. In the episode "Field Trip" he is supposedly captured and believed to be turned into a gnome but was actually his own choice. He comes back in episode "Trust" stating he has no recollection of what happened after he was caught by the gnomes. He clearly has feelings for CJ.
 Conner Owens (Andrew Dunbar) – Is part of a group trying to revert Tower Prep back to its original purpose. He can move through the holographic wall, with the help of Whisper 119, with things Ian and his friends need. When the system was upgraded to Whisper 120 they found a weak spot in West Campus. Conner goes down in the tunnels and is taken to West Campus by the gnomes. Conner gave Ian and Gabe Chemica Desin 2.0 and said that it was the end of everything.
 Cornelius Augustus Tower (David Smith, Matthew Thiessen) – As a former magician, fighter pilot during the first World War, and jazz artist, Cornelius Tower is the founder of Tower Prep and loved his students. The school was later taken over and he was betrayed. In an audio story of his life, he is cut off while saying 'they're turning my students into-'. He has an office in the back of a laboratory. He is missing an eye which he left in a glass paperweight. Ian may be related or close to him, since a picture is found of them together in a garden. In the episode "Fathers", it is revealed that he is still alive, working with Headmaster.
 Fenton Capwell (Charlie Carrick) – Fenton is a student who loves opera. In the episode "Monitored", he takes Ian's place as Ray's and Don's roommate, and in the episode "Election", he falls ill when running against Emily Wright in the presidential election. In the episode "Field Trip", he is assigned CJ as his partner. In the episode "Snitch" it is seen that he hangs out with Ray Snider, and they both suspect that Ian, CJ, Suki and Gabe are trying to escape.
 Emily Wright (Jodi Balfour) – Emily is the former class president of Tower Prep who lost her re-election bid to Gabe. She first appears in the episode "Election", where she meets Ian while trying to find the cause behind the illness of her original opponent, Fenton. She is assigned to work with Gabe on the class field trip. Emily is now the class vice president under Gabe. She tells Ian that she intends to join "The Broken", a resistance group against Tower Prep. After The Broken disappears, Emily is missing as well, hinting that she joined the group.

Minor
 Don Finch (Calum Worthy) – One of Ian's initial roommates and is Ray Snider's best friend. He doesn't show up in the series after Ian moves out.
 Shinji Sato (Terry Chen) – Suki Sato's older brother whom Suki assumed had been killed. In the episode "Phone Home", it was revealed that he was a student at Tower Prep. He knows about the observation center and also how to get into the west campus. He came back to take Suki back to Tokyo and their family.
 Emerson Poencet (Jeffrey Ballard) – Emerson is a student who first appears in the episode "Whisper". He has microscopic vision, which he uses to determine that the secret notes Ian gets are computer printouts, see Ian's individual blood cells, and accurately identify six different sets of fingerprints with a mere glance on a campaign button.
 Howard Gilmore (Jarod Joseph) – Howard has the ability to see in the dark. He used his ability to steal things, including Gabe's sock monkey Señor Guapo, and frame Ian for the thefts. He is sent to the West Campus. In their search for the real thief, Ian, Gabe, Suki, and CJ find Howard's hideout in the underground labs.
 Ross Anderson (Kacey Rohl) – Ross is Emily's ruthless campaign manager. At the end of the episode "Election", it is discovered that she spread the Chemica Desin enzyme inhibitor to those who threatened Emily's re-election. She is presumed to be sent to West Campus, but in reality, the Headmaster and Nurse are actually very impressed with her achievement.
 The Broken – A group that was led by Phillips, who dresses like Redfang. The Broken members think he may actually be Redfang. Emily told Ian about "The Broken" and he wanted to join. When Ian went to meet "The Broken" they suggested that he lead them for their plan to escape, but when Ian, Gabe,CJ, and Suki went to The Broken's hideout they were gone and only a gnome was left behind. Headmaster later tells the administration "The Broken was mended, but Archer is still broken, not for long though."
 Whisper 120 (voiced by Peggy Jo Jacobs) – Whisper 120 is the upgraded Whisper by Sato Systems and was introduced in the episode "Phone Home". She is not sentimental like Whisper 119, so she cannot go against her programming. She meets Ian, Gabe, Suki, and CJ in the forest after their escape in the season finale, informing them that they have "passed the test", have a "higher purpose", and must work for Headmaster to help win the "war to come".

Production

Development
Paul Dini wrote the first episode of Tower Prep, and Cartoon Network picked up the series as part of their initiative to develop live action programming for a family audience. The pilot was shot in 2009, and full production of the first season began in 2010 in Vancouver, British Columbia.

Former X-Files writer Glen Morgan was hired as executive producer and showrunner, joined by a writing team including Dini, Glen's brother Darin Morgan, Riley Stearns, Aury Wallington, Jeff Eckerle and Marilyn Osborn. Discussing his influences in creating the show, Dini states, "I thought about incidents when I was a kid. I went to a prep school, and I leaned back on my feelings of what it was like at the time – the strangeness and the alienation." From the start, the writers' goals were to create a story that did not talk down to kids, and to write natural dialogue, avoiding unrealistic slang and catchphrases. Many of the characters shift between being perceived as heroes or villains, because, Dini explains, "[throughout high school], your allegiances are switched and relationships change.... To a degree, Tower Prep is a real high school. It's just that the elements are blown out of proportion and into caricature."

The promotion for the series began with a fictional storyline, in which Cartoon Network published vlogs from the four main characters. Prior to the series premiere, a sneak peek of the show was released for free download on the iTunes Store featuring half of the first episode. To promote the premiere, the network announced a giveaway of 1,000 iPod Touch devices that would take place during the show. The iPod Touch strongly resembled the PDA devices from the series. The song "Unstoppable" by Foxy Shazam was used in network promos and in the episode "Trust".

The last two episodes of the first season aired on December 28, 2010. In October 2011, Cartoon Network removed all Tower Prep content from its website. In December 2011, Paul Dini announced that the series would not return for a second season.

Cancellation
On March 23, 2011, Cartoon Network announced their new and returning programs for the remainder of 2011 and Tower Prep was not mentioned as one of the returning series.

In December 2011, over a year after the series premiered, Dini announced on his Twitter account that the series would not be renewed for a second season, ending the series on a cliffhanger. When asked if he will reveal the ending to the series, Dini replied that he is "sworn to secrecy." In May 2012, Dini also revealed that there were talks of foreign financing for a second season, but the deal fell through because Cartoon Network decided not to air the show regardless.

In January 2013, Paul Dini revealed that Cartoon Network never gave him an answer for the cancellation of the series, though he speculated on Kevin Smith's Fatman on Batman podcast that an increased young female viewership over the network's young male target was a principal cause. Per the network's reasoning, according to Dini, the show's female viewers would be less likely to purchase merchandise. "We had a whole, a merchandise line for Tower Prep that they shitcanned before it ever got off the launching pad," he said on the show. "Because it's like, ... 'Boys buy the little spinny tops, they buy the action figures; girls buy princesses, we're not selling princesses.'" Alicia Lutes of Bustle acknowledged the impact of merchandising on viability of shows, referencing Dini's comments: "An undeniable truth about the television landscape today is that it's largely driven by marketing and advertising sales — or at least, the ability to sell a show to not just a small screen audience, but beyond the confines of that screen. Namely, via products. For a network like Cartoon Network, that would be toys. But they've somehow deduced that girls don't buy toys, or make good enough television viewers."

Dini also added that him and Cartoon Network intended for the series to run for 'five seasons' and had plans for season two to air in February 2011. Dini expressed interest in writing season three where he had planned for Ian to be the leader of the gnomes.

Episodes
{{Episode table |background=#92000A |overall=5 |title=22 |director=20 |writer=20 |airdate=18 |viewers=12 |country=US |episodes=

{{Episode list
| EpisodeNumber = 10
| Title = Phone Home
| DirectedBy = Michael Robison
| WrittenBy = Aury Wallington
| OriginalAirDate = 
| Viewers = 0.982<ref>{{cite web|url=http://tvbythenumbers.zap2it.com/2010/12/25/tuesday-1221-cable-ratings-16-pregnant-glory-daze-slip-millionaire-matchmaker-tower-prep-more/76566/ |archive-url=https://web.archive.org/web/20101228015256/http://tvbythenumbers.zap2it.com/2010/12/25/tuesday-1221-cable-ratings-16-pregnant-glory-daze-slip-millionaire-matchmaker-tower-prep-more/76566 |url-status=dead |archive-date=2010-12-28 |title=Tuesday 12/21 Cable Ratings: '16 & Pregnant,' 'Glory Daze,Storage Wars,' 'Tower Prep' & More – Ratings | TVbytheNumbers |publisher=Tvbythenumbers.zap2it.com |access-date=2011-12-09}}</ref>
| ShortSummary = On his birthday, Ian demands to speak to his parents. Headmaster allows the call, but it is later revealed that it was really Whisper impersonating his mother. Suki spies on Headmaster's office and sees her brother, Shinji, who she believed was dead, he was once a student at Tower Prep. Knowing her brother plans to later call home, Suki attempts to piggyback onto the signal with a homemade satellite phone. As the group are about to reach the roof of the nearest satellite point they a blocked by a gaping hole. When they are about to swing across CJ kisses Ian, since earlier he had admitted he had never kissed a girl. When they get across they discover Whisper was upgraded from version 119 to Whisper 120. They then successfully make the call, but Ian's mom claims that it is too dangerous to talk and hangs up.
| LineColor = 92000A
}}

}}

ReceptionTower Prep received critical acclaim from critics and audiences alike. Brian Lowry of Variety said the show's mysteries might appeal to both children and adults, calling it "a series that points the way toward a best-case scenario" for Cartoon Network's live-action programming. Robert Lloyd in his Los Angeles Times review praised the show's energy, casting, and writing in spite of its modest production values. Both reviewers noted the series shares elements with The Prisoner and other works such as Harry Potter, Lost and The X-Files''. Emily VanDerWerff of The A.V. Club stated that while the pilot episode suffered from low production values and murky fight scenes, it benefited from a strong primary cast, Dini's use of superpowers, and potentially intriguing moments. Further, she specifically pointed to the involvement of creator Paul Dini and producers Glen Morgan and Darin Morgan as reasons she believed the show would grow into a compelling series. In the 2011 Leo Awards, Brenton Spencer was nominated for Best Direction in a Youth or Children's Program or Series for the episode "Dreams".

Notes

References

External links

 

2010 American television series debuts
2010 American television series endings
2010s American high school television series
2010s American mystery television series
2010s American teen drama television series
2010 Canadian television series debuts
2010 Canadian television series endings
2010s Canadian high school television series
2010s Canadian teen drama television series
American adventure television series
Canadian adventure television series
Canadian mystery television series
Television series about artificial intelligence
Cartoon Network original programming
Cartoon Network Studios superheroes
English-language television shows
Serial drama television series
Teen superhero television series
Television series about teenagers
Television shows filmed in Vancouver
Television series by Cartoon Network Studios
Television series by Sony Pictures Television